Far'a, Faraa or al-Fari'ah is a Palestinian refugee camp in the foothills of the Jordan Valley in the northwestern West Bank, located 12 kilometers south of Jenin and 2 kilometers south of Tubas, three kilometers northwest of Tammun and 17 kilometers northeast of Nablus. According to the Palestinian Central Bureau of Statistics (PCBS), the camp had a population of 5,750 refugees in 2006, however, the UNRWA has recorded a population of 7,244 registered refugees.

Far'a was established in 1949 following the 1948 Arab-Israeli War on 255 dunams of land. It is one of the few camps in the West Bank that is supplied water by the nearby spring of Far'a, from which the camp receives its name. The camp was under Jordanian and Israeli occupation until November 1998, when it came under the complete control of the Palestinian National Authority, as a result of the Wye River Memorandum.

Most of the camp's labor force works in agriculture and some work in construction in the Israeli settlements of the Jordan Valley. In 1996, the UNRWA built two schools in Far'a with financial contributions from the European Union and by 2005 there were 1,794 pupils. In 2005, 863 families depended on UN food rations.

See also
 Ras al-Far'a town
 Wadi al-Far'a village
 Wadi al-Far'a (river)

References

External links
 El Far'a Camp (Fact Sheet), Applied Research Institute–Jerusalem (ARIJ) February, 2006
El Far'a Camp Profile, ARIJ, 2006
 Far'a, articles from UNRWA

Populated places established in 1949
Palestinian refugee camps in the West Bank
Tubas Governorate